Pic de Canalbona is a mountain of Catalonia, Spain.

The Estanyol Occidental de Canalbona or Estany de Canalbona is a small glacial lake located between the Pic de Canalbona and the Rodó de Canalbona, at the base of the "Collet Fals" in the Montcalm Massif near the Pica d'Estats. The lake drains towards the Catalan side. Most years the ice completely melts by the end of summer.

This mountain should not be confused with the Pic Rodó de Canalbona, a higher neighboring summit.

References

Mountains of Catalonia
Mountains of the Pyrenees